Barnstaple is a town in Devon, England.

Barnstaple may also refer to:

 Barnstaple (UK Parliament constituency)
 Barnstaple railway station
 HMS Barnstaple (1919), a minesweeper in World War I
 Barnstaple Town F.C., Barnstaple's football club

See also
 Barnstable (disambiguation)